Prague 4, formally the Prague 4 Municipal District (Městská čast Praha 4), is a second-tier municipality in Prague. The administrative district (správní obvod) of the same name consists of municipal districts Prague 4 and Kunratice.

Prague 4 is located just south of Prague 2 and is the biggest municipality in Prague.  Most of this district consists of large estates of panelaks.  The district is also well connected to the motorway to Brno.

Government and infrastructure
The Prison Service of the Czech Republic is headquartered in this district.

Education
Two campuses of the Prague British International School are in Prague 4: Kamýk and Libuš. Kamýk belonged to the pre-merger Prague British School, while Libuš belonged to the pre-merger English International School Prague and opened in 2007.

See also
Districts of Prague#Symbols

References

External links
 Prague 4 official site
 Census statistics for Czech municipalities (in Czech)

 
Districts of Prague